Fahad Younes (Arabic:فهد يونس) (born 30 July 1994) is a Qatari footballer. He currently plays for Al-Rayyan .

References

External links
 

Qatari footballers
1994 births
Living people
Al Ahli SC (Doha) players
El Jaish SC players
Al-Markhiya SC players
Al-Rayyan SC players
Qatar Stars League players
Association football goalkeepers
Qatar youth international footballers
Qatar under-20 international footballers